COSMOTE MOBILE TELECOMMUNICATIONS S.A. known as just Cosmote is the largest mobile network operator in Greece. The company is headquartered in Athens and is a fully owned subsidiary of the Hellenic Telecommunications Organization (OTE), the incumbent telecommunications provider in Greece. COSMOTE has developed business operations in two other South East Europe countries through subsidiaries: Telekom Albania (now One Telecommunications) and Telekom Romania, addressing an extended market of 45 million people. In all three countries COSMOTE counts approximately 35.6 million customers.

In September 2015, the parent company OTE announced they are to adopt the COSMOTE brand as their uniform commercial brand covering fixed, broadband and mobile telephony. At this time, the company has chosen not to adopt the Deutsche Telekom brand under which name it operates in its Central and Eastern European operations.

On Monday 26 October, the new logo was launched. The Display name of COSMOTE: GR COSMOTE or C-OTE

History

COSMOTE launched commercial operations in Greece in April 1998 and reached 1 million subscribers a year later. In 2000, the company was listed in the Athens Exchange. In 2001, COSMOTE reached a customer base of 2.5 million becoming the largest mobile network operator in Greece.

In 2006, COSMOTE acquired 99% of Germanos SA from its owner Panos Germanos, a multinational chain of retail electronic goods vendors. During the same year COSMOTE was listed among the top performers in the technology industry worldwide according to BusinessWeek's Information Technology 100 rankings, being the only Greek company in the list.

In February 2007, COSMOTE launched internet broadband (ADSL) and mobile telephony services bundles for the first time in the Greek market. In November of the same year, OTE submitted a voluntary tender offer to acquire the remaining shares of COSMOTE. COSMOTE shares ceased trading on 1 April 2008, almost eight years after the company's launch in the Athens Exchange.

In 2008, COSMOTE signed an agreement with Telekom Slovenije for the transfer of 100% of the former's participation in both COSMOFON and Germanos in North Macedonia, which were later both rebranded.

In 2010, COSMOTE upgraded its network, introducing speeds up to 42.2Mbit/s downlink & 5.8Mbit/s uplink and announced LTE trials on a pilot base.

In September 2011, COSMOTE's 3G network population coverage exceeded 98%. In November of the same year COSMOTE renewed its current licence in the 900 MHz band and secured additional spectrum in the 900 & 1800 MHz bands in the auction conducted by the Hellenic Telecommunications and Post Commission (EETT).

In January 2012 COSMOTE launched 3rd generation services in Albania and just in April 3G population coverage reached 98%. In November, COSMOTE, first in Greece, launched commercially its 4G LTE (Long Term Evolution) mobile broadband network in Athens and Thessaloniki.

In August 2013, The Globul mobile network and Germanos, subsidiaries of COSMOTE in Bulgaria, were sold to Telenor and were both later rebranded.

In September 2014, COSMOTE Romania was merged commercially with Romtelecom and rebranded adopting the Deutsche Telekom brand name, Telekom.

In July 2015, the subsidiary AMC in Albania also was rebranded and adopted the Telekom brand.

In September 2015, OTE announced the intention to unify all services under the COSMOTE brand. The company have chosen not to adopt the Telekom brand name in the Greek market.

In September 2017, the company, followed by the popularity of a series of services called Tzampa (which stands for free/cheap), had taken measures against them. Tzampa was very popular among free mobile data hack VPNs, given the thousands of downloads of its app.

Subsidiaries
One Telecommunications: COSMOTE acquired 85% of the share capital of the Albanian mobile operator AMC in 2000. In April 2009, COSMOTE raised its participation in AMC to 97.6% by acquiring a further 12.6% stake that was until then held by the Albanian State, against a cash consideration of 48.2 mil. Euro. In July 2015, AMC rebranded as Telekom Albania and fully went under German supervising. On January 16, 2019 OTE part of Deutsche Telekom agreed to sell Telekom Albania for €50 million to Vivacom Bulgaria.

Telekom Romania: In July 2005, COSMOTE acquired 70% of the Romanian operator COSMOROM which was the mobile arm of Romanian national incumbent operator Romtelecom. Later that year, COSMOROM was rebranded to COSMOTE Romania. In November 2009, COSMOTE acquired Telemobil SA (Zapp), the first CDMA 450 MHz mobile phone operator in Romania, thereby gaining access to 3G license and infrastructure in the country. In September 2014, COSMOTE Romania was merged commercially with Romtelecom, as part of a rebranding and consolidation process, into Telekom Romania.

Germanos SA: A multinational retail network for telecommunication services and products with operations in Greece and Romania, joined COSMOTE in 2006.

Sponsorships

Under its Corporate Responsibility (CR) programme, COSMOTE supports actions related to the environment, society, the marketplace, the workplace and public awareness. Actions undertaken in this context include inter alia a joint sponsorship, together with the Hellenic Telecommunications Organization (OTE), of the Athens 2004 Olympic Games. COSMOTE has also initiated a Scholarship programme for university studies, awarding scholarships to high school graduates who have been admitted as first year students in higher educational institutions in Greece.

In October 2011, COSMOTE announced that will support, together with OTE, the digitisation of the libraries of the Halki seminary in Constantinople.

In 2012, OTE and COSMOTE announced the sponsorship of the exhibition "The Antikythera Shipwreck: The ship, the Treasures, the Mechanism", of the National Archaeological Museum.

Shareholding structure
The Hellenic Telecommunications Organization (OTE) owns 100% of COSMOTE. On 14.5.2008 the Greek government and Deutsche Telekom (DT) reached an agreement regarding DT's entrance in OTE's share capital. The agreement provided that each party would have a stake of 25% + 1 share. On 3 August, DT increased its stake in OTE by 5% to 30%. In June 2011 the German Group acquired an extra 10% stake raising its participation to 40%.

Financial results

References

Mobile phone companies of Greece
Mobile phone companies of the United States
Greek brands
Greek companies established in 1998
Telecommunications companies established in 1998